Karl Hartwig Gregor von Meusebach (6 June 1781 – 22 August 1847) was a German lawyer and literary scholar born in Voigtstedt, Thuringia. He used the pseudonyms "Alban" and "Markus Hüpfinsholz" in his writings. He was father to politician John O. Meusebach (1812-1897).

He studied in Göttingen and Leipzig, and in 1803 was appointed chancery-accessor in Dillenburg. Up until 1842 he was president of the Rheinischen Kassationshofs (Rhineland Cassation).

Meusebach was an expert on German literature, and during his lifetime amassed a personal library of 36,000 volumes of 16th–17th century literature, German church music, folk songs, chapbooks, et al. After his death, his collection was purchased by the Staatsbibliothek zu Berlin (Royal Library in Berlin) for 14700 Taler with support from Friedrich Wilhelm IV.

He was a good friend of the brothers Jacob and Wilhelm Grimm, and was supportive of young scientists and writers that included poet August Heinrich Hoffmann von Fallersleben.

Selected publications 
 Kornblumen (Cornflowers), 1804. 
 Geist aus meinen Schriften. Durch mich selbst herausgezogen, und an das Licht gestellt; 1809. 
 Zur Recension der deutschen Grammatik (On the recension of German grammar), irrefuted by Jacob Grimm, 1826.
 Fischart-Studien (Fischart studies), edited by Camillus Wendeler, 1879. 
 Briefwechsel des Freiherrn Karl Hartwig Gregor von Meusebach mit Jacob und Wilhelm Grimm (Correspondence of Baron Karl Hartwig Gregor von Meusebach with Jacob and Wilhelm Grimm), edited by Camillus Wendeler, 1880.

References 
 "This article is based on a translation of an equivqlent article at the German Wikipedia."
 Staatsbibliothek zu Berlin, The Meusebach Library

German collectors
German scholars
People from Kyffhäuserkreis
1781 births
1847 deaths